Ceryx basilewskyi is a moth of the family Erebidae. It was described by Sergius G. Kiriakoff in 1955. It is found in Burundi.

References

Ceryx (moth)
Moths described in 1955